"My Generation" is a song by the English rock band the Who, which became a hit and one of their most recognizable songs. The song was named the 11th greatest song by Rolling Stone on its list of the 500 Greatest Songs of All Time. It became part of The Rock and Roll Hall of Fame's 500 Songs that Shaped Rock and Roll and is inducted into the Grammy Hall of Fame for "historical, artistic and significant" value. It has been considered the band's signature song.

The song was released as a single on 29 October 1965, reaching No. 2 in the United Kingdom (The Who's highest-charting single in their home country along with 1966's "I'm a Boy") and No. 74 in the United States. "My Generation" also appeared on The Who's 1965 debut album, My Generation (The Who Sings My Generation in the United States), and in greatly extended form on their live album Live at Leeds (1970). Although The Who re-recorded the song for the Ready Steady Who EP in 1966, ultimately it was not included, and remained unissued until the 1995 remaster of A Quick One. The main difference between this version and the original is that it is heavily abridged and instead of the hail of feedback which closes the original, the band play a chaotic rendition of Edward Elgar's "Land of Hope and Glory". In the album's liner notes the song is thus credited to both Pete Townshend and Elgar.

Inspiration
Townshend reportedly wrote the song on a train and is said to have been inspired by the Queen Mother, who is alleged to have had Townshend's 1935 Packard hearse towed off a street in Belgravia because she was offended by the sight of it during her daily drive through the neighbourhood. Townshend has also credited Mose Allison's "Young Man Blues" as the inspiration for the song, saying "Without Mose I wouldn't have written 'My Generation'." Townshend told Rolling Stone in 1985 that "'My Generation' was very much about trying to find a place in society."

On a later interview for Good Morning America, in 1989, the band was discussing the upcoming 1989 tour to celebrate the 20th anniversary of Tommy, and Townshend talked about the famous line "I hope I die before I get old." He said that, for him, when he wrote the lyrics, "old" meant "very rich".

Composition

The song's lyrics comprise a distilled statement of youthful rebellion. The tone of the track is a forebear of the punk rock movement. One of the most quoted—and patently rewritten—lines in rock history is "I hope I die before I get old," famously sneered by lead singer Roger Daltrey.

Like much of The Who's earlier Mod output, the song boasts clear influences of American rhythm and blues, most explicitly in the call and response form of the verses. Daltrey would sing a line, and the backing vocalists, Pete Townshend (low harmony) and John Entwistle (high harmony), would respond with the refrain "Talkin' 'bout my generation":

People try to put us d-down (Talkin' 'bout my generation)
Just because we g-g-get around (Talkin' 'bout my generation)
Things they do look awful c-c-cold (Talkin' 'bout my generation)
I hope I die before I get old (Talkin' 'bout my generation)

The vocal melody of "My Generation" is an example of the shout-and-fall modal frame. This call and response is mirrored in the instrumental break with solo emphasis passing from Townshend's guitar to Entwistle's bass and back again several times.

Another salient aspect of "My Generation" is Daltrey's delivery: an angry and frustrated stutter. Various stories exist as to the reason for this distinct delivery. One is that the song began as a slow talking blues number without the stutter (in the 1970s it was sometimes performed as such, but with the stutter, as "My Generation Blues"), but after being inspired by John Lee Hooker's "Stuttering Blues", Townshend reworked the song into its present form. Another reason is that it was suggested to Daltrey that he stutter to sound like a British mod on speed (amphetamines). It is also proposed, albeit less frequently, that the stutter was introduced to give the group a framework for implying an expletive in the lyrics: "Why don't you all fff ... fade away!" However, producer Shel Talmy insisted it was simply "one of those happy accidents" that he thought they should keep. Roger Daltrey has also commented that he had not rehearsed the song prior to the recording, was nervous, and he was unable to hear his own voice through the monitors. The stutter came about as he tried to fit the lyrics to the music, and Talmy decided it worked well enough to keep. The BBC initially refused to play "My Generation" because it did not want to offend people who stutter, but it reversed its decision after the song became more popular.

The instrumental elements of the song are fast and aggressive. Significantly, "My Generation" also featured one of the first bass solos in rock history. This was played by Entwistle on his Fender Jazz Bass, rather than the Danelectro bass he wanted to use; after buying three Danelectros with rare thin strings that kept breaking easily (and were not available separately), a frustrated Entwistle used his Fender strung with nylon tapewound strings and was forced to simplify the solo. The song's coda features drumming from Keith Moon, as well, whereupon the song breaks down in spurts of guitar feedback from Townshend's Rickenbacker, rather than fading out or ending cleanly on the tonic. There are two guitar parts. The basic instrumental track (as reflected on the instrumental version on the My Generation Deluxe edition) followed by Townshend's overdubs including the furious feedback on the coda. Similarly to The Kinks's "You Really Got Me" (also produced by Shel Talmy), the song modulates from its opening key of G up to C via the keys of A and B. Townshend's guitars were tuned down a whole step for the recording.

For the band the song was the basis for an extended medley or improvisation, going on as long as fifteen minutes, as evinced by the version appearing on Live at Leeds. Live recordings from 1969 to 1970 include snippets of music from Tommy as well as parts of what would become "Naked Eye".

Townshend's demo version of the song (together with a demo of "Pinball Wizard") appeared on a flexi disc included in the original edition of the book The Who: Maximum R&B by Richard Barnes.

Personnel
Personnel per Pete Townshend.
Roger Daltrey – lead vocals
Pete Townshend – electric guitar, backing vocals
John Entwistle – bass guitar, backing vocals
Keith Moon – drums

Reception
Rolling Stone named the song the eleventh greatest song on its 500 Greatest Songs of All Time list. and, in 2009, VH1 named it the thirty-seventh Greatest Hard Rock Song. It is also part of The Rock and Roll Hall of Fame's 500 Songs that Shaped Rock and Roll and is inducted into the Grammy Hall of Fame for "historical, artistic and significant" value.

The song has been said by NME to have "encapsulated the angst of being a teenager", and has been characterized as a "nod to the Mod counterculture". NME journalist Larry Bartleet in 2015 rated the Who's recording ten points out of ten. Cash Box described it as a "rollicking, blues-drenched handclapper which sez that today's kids have more rights than their elders think."

Covers
“My Generation” was covered by the American band Green Day on their 1991 album Kerplunk!

Chart performance
The song was released as a single on 29 October 1965, reaching No. 2 in the UK, The Who's highest-charting single in their home country and No. 74 in America.

Charts

Certifications

See also
Counterculture of the 1960s

References

1965 songs
1965 singles
Brunswick Records singles
Decca Records singles
Grammy Hall of Fame Award recipients
Protest songs
Song recordings produced by Shel Talmy
Songs written by Pete Townshend
Songs about teenagers
The Who songs
Songs banned by the BBC